The Korea Railroad Corporation (Korean: 한국철도공사,), branded as KORAIL (코레일, officially changed to  in November 2019), is the national railway operator in South Korea. Currently, KORAIL is a public corporation, managed by Ministry of Land, Infrastructure and Transportation.

KORAIL operates intercity/regional, commuter/metro and freight trains throughout South Korea, and has its headquarters in Daejeon.

History 

Historically, the South Korean railway network was managed by the Railroad Administration Bureau of the Ministry of Transportation before 1963. On 1 September 1963, the bureau became an agency that was known as Korean National Railroad (KNR) in English. In the early 2000s, split and public corporatization of KNR was decided by the South Korean government, and in 2003, KNR adopted the current KORAIL logo in blue to prepare corporatization. On 1 January 2005, KNR was split into Korea Railroad Corporation (KORAIL), which succeeded railway operation with the KORAIL logo and name, and Korea National Railway (KNR), which succeeded railway construction and maintaining tracks.

Services 

Excluding the other high-speed service provider, SR, South Korean high-speed and intercity services are provided by KORAIL. Currently, KORAIL provides 5 classes of railway and metro services.

KTX 

KTX (Korea Train eXpress) is currently the highest class of KORAIL services. KTX services are provided on the Gyeongbu HSR and Honam HSR, as well as their branches such as Gyeongjeon Line, Donghae Line, or Jeolla Line.

ITX 

ITX (Intercity Train eXpress) are group of intercity services. First ITX service was introduced in 2012, which was named as ITX-Cheongchun (ITX-청춘) on Gyeongchun Line.

Before the introduction of ITX services, intercity trains are named as Saemaul-ho (새마을호), which borrowed its name from New Community Movement. Later, Saemaul-ho services are merged into ITX as ITX-Saemaeul (ITX-새마을). Currently, remaining Saemaul-ho services are only operated on Janghang Line.

Mugunghwa-ho and Nuriro 

Mugunghwa-ho (무궁화호) and its planned successor Nuriro (누리로) services are regional train services of KORAIL. Mugunghwa-ho, inspired its name from national floral emblem hibiscus, was introduced as express service at first, but after the introduction of KTX, it was degraded into regional services.

Currently, Nuriro services are provided by only EMU trains (class 20). KORAIL has a plan of introducing Nuriro with newly ordered EMU-150.

Urban railway services 

Named as metro services (전동열차), these services are provided in the Seoul Metropolitan Area and the Busan Metropolitan Area. Sometimes it is considered as a successor of Bidulgi-ho (비둘기호) class trains. Officially, fare systems of these services are separate from other services operated by Korail; such services are integrated with subway fare systems, allowing free transfers between Korail-operated lines and local metro lines.

Seoul 

 Line 1 is a large service corridor consisting of the following Korail lines that through operate to and from Seoul Metro Line 1
Gyeongbu Line — (Namyeong–Cheonan) 
Gyeongin Line  — (Guro–Incheon) 
Gyeongwon Line — (Soyosan–Hoegi) 
Janghang Line — (Cheonan–Sinchang(Soonchunhyang Univ.)) 
 Line 3 
Ilsan Line — (Jichuk–Daehwa) with through operation to Seoul Metro Line 3
 Line 4 is a long service corridor consisting of the following Korail lines that through operate to and from Seoul Metro Line 4 
Jinjeop Line — (Jinjeop–ByeollaeByeolgaram)
Ansan Line — (Geumjeong–Oido)
Gwacheon Line — (Seonbawi–Geumjeong) 
  a large service corridor consisting of the following lines:
Bundang Line (1994) — (Cheongnyangni–Suwon)
Suin Line (2012) —  (Suwon–Incheon)
  — (Seoul–Chuncheon)
 a large service corridor consisting of the following lines:
Gyeongui Line — (Seoul–Munsan) 
Gyeongwon Line — (Hoegi–Yongsan)
Jungang Line — (Cheongnyangni–Jipyeong) 
Yongsan Line — (Yongsan–Gajwa)
 Gyeonggang Line —  (Pangyo–Yeoju)

Busan 
 Donghae Line — (Bujeon–Taehwagang) is part of Donghae Line service

Sightseeing trains 
KORAIL has a number of tourist or sightseeing trains, including the Sea Train, DMZ Train, V-Train, S-Train, A-Train, and G-Train.

Passes 
Korail offers a rail pass called Korea Rail Pass, or KR Pass for short, to foreign travelers, such that they can take most of the trains operated by Korail freely, including KTX. However, subways and tourist trains operated by KORAIL are not covered.

Foreigners living in South Korea for more than six months are ineligible to use a KR Pass, but Korail offers the Happy Rail Pass, which is very similar to the KR Pass, for a slightly higher price.

Labor relations 
Most of the railroad's employees are members of the Korean Railway Workers' Union, which is frequently at odds with KORAIL management.  Strikes, such as the South Korean railroad strike of 2006, are not uncommon.

In December 2013, 23,000–100,000 union members and friends protested the privatization of KORAIL in Seoul.

Subsidiaries 
Korail Networks, for ticketing management and Korail frequent riders program.
Korail Retail, for advertisement management and running "Storyway" convenience store.
Korail Tour Service, for KTX/Saemaeul-ho train crew and travel service.

International service 
  North Korea (Korean State Railway): 
Until the division of Korea following the end of the Second World War, the Gyeongui Line and Gyeongwon Line extended into what is now North Korea.  The Gyeongui Line connected Seoul to Kaesong, Pyongyang, and Sinuiju on the Chinese border, while the Gyeongwon Line served Wonsan on the east coast.  Another line—the Kumgangsan Electric Railway—connected the town of Cheorwon, now on the border of North and South Korea, on the Gyeongwon Line, to Mt. Geumgang, now in the North.

The Gyeongui Line is one of two lines whose southern and northern halves are now being reconnected, the other line being the Donghae Bukbu Line. On 17 May 2007, two test trains ran on the reconnected lines: one on the west line from Munsan to Kaesong; the second on the east from Jejin to Kumgang.

In December 2007, regular freight service started on the Gyeongui line, from South Korea into the Kaesong Industrial Park in the north. The service has been underutilized, however: as it was reported in October 2008, on 150 out of 163 return trips that had been done so far, the train carried no cargo at all. The total amount of cargo carried over this period had been merely 340 tons. This absence of interest in the service has been explained by the customers' (companies operating in Kaesong) preference for road transport. In November 2008, North Korea shut down the link. However, railroad transportation from South Korea to North Korea resumed again on 30 November 2018, when a South Korean train carrying railroad inspectors entered North Korea.

A Trans-Korean Main Line, spanning North Korea and connecting to Russian Railways, is being planned. On 30 November 2018, 30 officials from North and South Korea began an 18-day survey in both Koreas to connect the Korean railroads. The survey, which had previously been obstructed by the Korean Demilitarized Zone's (DMZ) "frontline" guard posts and landmines located at the DMZ's Arrowhead Hill, consists of a -long railroad section between Kaesong and Sinuiju that cuts through the North's central region and northeastern coast. The railway survey, which involved the inspection of the Gyeongui Line, concluded on 5 December 2018. On 8 December 2018, an inter-Korean survey began in both Koreas for the Donghae Line.

On 13 December 2018, it was announced that the groundbreaking ceremony to symbolize the reconnection of the roads and railways in both Koreas will be held on 26 December 2018 in the North Korean city of Kaesong. On 17 December 2018, the latest inter-Korean railway survey, which involved an 800-km rail from Kumgangsan near the inter-Korean border to the Tumen River bordering Russia in the east, was completed.  A potential threat to the groundbreaking ceremony emerged after it was revealed that the North Korean railway was in poor condition. On 21 December 2018, however, the United States agreed to no longer obstruct plans by both Koreas to hold a groundbreaking ceremony. The same day, a four-day inter-Korean road survey began when ten working-level South Korean surveyors entered North Korea to work with ten North Korean surveyors on a three-day survey 100-km-long section on the eastern Donghae Line. On 24 December 2018, the four-day road survey, which will assist with the groundbreaking ceremony for the railroad, was completed after a separate team of ten South Korean surveyors entered North Korea and joined ten North Korean surveyors to survey a 4-km-long road in Kaesong. On 26 December 2018, the groundbreaking ceremony was held as scheduled in Kaesong. About 100 South Korean officials attended the ceremony after departing to North Korea on a Korail train based at Dorasan Station in Palu.

  Japan
JR Kyushu offers a jet foil ferry service between Busan and Fukuoka taking about 3 hours. KORAIL and JR West had a joint rail pass (called ) which included discounted KTX and Shinkansen tickets and Busan-Shimonoseki/Fukuoka ferry tickets, but the pass was discontinued due to low ridership.

There are no railway connections between both countries. The Korean Strait undersea tunnel connecting Fukuoka and Busan via Tsushima had been proposed as far back as 1917, but the plan has never progressed beyond the research phase. While the increased wealth of South Korea and continued growth of trade between the nations has made the economic case for the tunnel more compelling, promotion has focused more on using the project to reduce political tension between the nations.

See also 
List of suburban and commuter rail systems
Korean State Railway, North Korea's national rail operator
Daejeon Korail FC, Korea National League football team.
Korea Rail Network Authority
KTX Family Card, frequent riders program
Transportation in South Korea

References

External links 

Online reservation

 
Government-owned companies of South Korea
Railway companies of South Korea
Railway companies established in 1963
Companies based in Daejeon
South Korean brands
1500 V DC railway electrification
25 kV AC railway electrification
South Korean companies established in 1963
Government-owned railway companies